Black Mass is a 2015 American biographical crime drama film about American mobster Whitey Bulger. Directed by Scott Cooper and written by Mark Mallouk and Jez Butterworth, it is based on Dick Lehr and Gerard O'Neill's 2001 book Black Mass: The True Story of an Unholy Alliance Between the FBI and the Irish Mob. The film features an ensemble cast led by Johnny Depp as Bulger, alongside Joel Edgerton, Benedict Cumberbatch, Kevin Bacon, Jesse Plemons, Peter Sarsgaard, Dakota Johnson, and Corey Stoll.

Principal photography of the film began on May 19, 2014, in Boston and wrapped on August 1, 2014. The film had its world premiere at the 72nd Venice International Film Festival and was released by Warner Bros. worldwide on September 18, 2015. It received generally positive reviews and grossed $99 million on a $53 million budget.

Plot
In 1975, James "Whitey" Bulger, leader of the Winter Hill Gang, controls most organized crime within South Boston, along with his right-hand man Stephen Flemmi, newcomer Kevin Weeks, and callous hitman Johnny Martorano. Bulger lives with his longtime partner Lindsey Cyr and their young son Douglas.

Bulger's supremacy is challenged by the North End-based Angiulo Brothers, a rival gang that is part of the New England Mafia family. FBI agent John Connolly returns to the area, having grown up in South Boston as a friend of Whitey and his brother, Massachusetts Senate President William "Billy" Bulger.

After the Angiulo Brothers send a motorcycle-riding assassin who murders a Winter Hill soldier, Whitey becomes an informant for Connolly. Connolly believes he can infiltrate the Angiulo Brothers' organization with Whitey's help. Although Whitey hates the idea of being a rat, he understands the protection doing so would afford him, his gang, and his family. Douglas suffers from Reye syndrome, leading the devastated Lindsey to remove him from life support over Whitey's furious objections.

Although Connolly is supported by his co-worker John Morris, their boss, Charles McGuire, is suspicious. Whitey increasingly exploits his status as an informant, using Connolly's "protection" as a cover for his crimes. When Connolly demands information on the Angiulos' racketeering locations, Whitey gets pictures of the rival gang's hideouts, allowing the FBI to plant wiretaps. The FBI arrests the Angiulos, thus eliminating the remaining opposition to Whitey's power. Blinded by his past, Connolly grows closer to Whitey and the gang and even invites them to his house for a cookout. His wife, Marianne, sees negative changes in her husband as his agent-informant relationship with Whitey grows, including accepting expensive gifts and money from the gang.

An associate, Brian Halloran, fears for his own life and goes to the FBI to report Whitey's involvement, much to Connolly's displeasure. Connolly then tells Whitey of Halloran's accusation, thereby resulting in the murders of Halloran and an unnamed accomplice. Following his mother's death, Whitey's behavior becomes increasingly violent and unpredictable, deteriorating his informant relationship.

When "bulldog" prosecutor Fred Wyshak is appointed the new assistant U. S. Attorney in Boston, Connolly attempts to make friends and perhaps divert his attention from Whitey. Still, Wyshak bluntly refuses and demands the FBI arrest him. John McIntyre, an informant within the Winter Hill Gang, informs on an attempt by Whitey to smuggle weapons for the IRA. The shipment is seized, and Whitey kills McIntyre after Connolly tips him off.

Wyshak and McGuire investigate Connolly's management of Whitey's informant role and realize that most of the "tips" provided by Whitey were already obtained from other informants (that Bulger could've possibly killed since he was ironically known for killing "Rats"). Morris, disillusioned and fearing prosecution for his association with Connolly's activities, divulges Connolly's and Whitey's relationship to The Boston Globe, and a front-page story exposes the FBI's links to organized crime. As Connolly, Flemmi, Weeks, and Martorano are arrested, Whitey gives Billy a final goodbye from a gas station pay phone before leaving Boston.

A textual epilogue reveals Weeks received a five-year sentence, Martorano a twelve-year sentence, and Flemmi a life sentence, while Morris received immunity for his cooperation; Billy became Chancellor of the University of Massachusetts but resigned following the discovery that he was in touch with Whitey; Connolly was convicted of second-degree murder and received a forty-year sentence, and Whitey, after an anonymous tip led to his arrest on June 22, 2011, in Santa Monica, California, received two consecutive life sentences with an added five years.

Cast

 Johnny Depp as James "Whitey" Bulger
 Joel Edgerton as John Connolly
 Benedict Cumberbatch as William "Billy" Bulger
 Rory Cochrane as Stephen "The Rifleman" Flemmi
 Kevin Bacon as Charles McGuire
 Jesse Plemons as Kevin Weeks
 Peter Sarsgaard as Brian Halloran
 Dakota Johnson as Lindsey Cyr
 Corey Stoll as Fred Wyshak
 David Harbour as John Morris
 Julianne Nicholson as Marianne Connolly (née Lockary)
 Adam Scott as Robert Fitzpatrick
 Brad Carter as John McIntyre
 W. Earl Brown as Johnny Martorano
 Mark Mahoney as Mickey Maloney
 Juno Temple as Deborah Hussey
 Erica McDermott as Mary Bulger
 Bill Camp as John Callahan
 Scott Anderson as Tommy King
 David DeBeck as Roger Wheeler
 Jamie Donnelly as Ms. Cody
 Patrick M. Walsh as Michael Donahue
 Jeremy Strong as Josh Bond (uncredited)
 James Russo as Scott Garriola (uncredited)

Production

Development
An idea for a film adaptation of Black Mass: The True Story of an Unholy Alliance Between the FBI and the Irish Mob garnered interest intermittently since 2000. Even before its published release, the book's film rights had already been sold to Miramax, when Harvey Weinstein was still part of the company. According to co-author Dick Lehr, Weinstein had never exercised the film option for unknown reasons, and the rights expired. At one point afterwards, in 2002, filmmaker Robert Greenwald had planned to adapt Black Mass into a 4-hour miniseries for USA Network, but the project was never developed. Eventually in 2006, film producer Brian Oliver acquired the film rights for Black Mass, and was set to produce the adaptation with CP Production partners Michael Cerenzie and Christine Peters.

After Oliver's acquisition, Jim Sheridan was attached to direct the film. In 2009, Sheridan had finished writing a draft of the adapted screenplay with Nye Heron, and principal photography was reportedly scheduled to begin in April 2010. However, in December 2010, while discussing the troubled production of his 2011 film Dream House, Sheridan hinted at his detachment from the Black Mass project. Oliver's then-newly founded Cross Creek Pictures film production company took over financing for Black Mass, and Sheridan's exit was confirmed when Russell Gewirtz was hired in 2011 to write another draft for the adaptation, and Barry Levinson was attached to direct instead. The finished version of Black Mass was scripted by Mark Mallouk and Jez Butterworth, and has been billed as the "true story of Whitey Bulger, FBI agent John Connolly and the FBI's witness protection program that was created by J. Edgar Hoover."

Later in January 2014, Scott Cooper was attached to re-write and direct the film. On February 27, 2014, Warner Bros. picked up the film's worldwide distribution rights, eyeing an October 2015 release, and the studio co-financed the film with Cross Creek.

Casting
Johnny Depp's involvement with Black Mass dates back to February 2013, when he was attached to star in the film, while Barry Levinson was still slated to direct and principal photography was scheduled to begin in May 2013. Depp briefly exited the project shortly after its sale at the 66th annual Cannes Film Festival, because of a salary dispute with Cross Creek Pictures. He later rejoined at around the same time Scott Cooper was attached to replace Levinson as director, and his signing for the film was made official in February 2014. Jesse Plemons and Juno Temple joined the cast to play as Kevin Weeks (a cohort of Bulger) and Deborah Hussey, one of Bulger's victims, respectively, around April 2014. Plemons reportedly prepared for his role by hiring a dialect coach and studying video of the actual Kevin Weeks.

Benedict Cumberbatch replaced Guy Pearce as William "Billy" Bulger on May 22, 2014. On June 10, it was announced that Jeremy Strong would co-star in the film. On June 14, James Russo joined the cast of the film to play Scott Garriola, one of the FBI agents who took down Bulger. On June 26, Kevin Bacon was added to the cast to play Charles McGuire, the FBI Special Agent in charge of the Boston field office and John Connolly's boss. On July 1, David Harbour was added to the cast of the film to star as John Morris, a corrupt FBI agent along with Connolly.

The roles of Connolly – who was Whitey Bulger's FBI handler – and his first wife Marianne, were filled by Joel Edgerton and Julianne Nicholson, respectively. Cooper chose Nicholson for the part after her performance as Sally in Sam Shepard's off-Broadway play Heartless (before Claire van der Boom succeeded her for the play's two-week extension). Edgerton developed his portrayal of Connolly by studying past footage of the FBI agent before his imprisonment, some of which include his appearances on talk shows and in courtrooms. In an interview with The Wall Street Journal, Edgerton stated that he declined trying to meet with the actual Connolly, reasoning that Connolly "has one version of events and the film has a different version". Edgerton originally dropped out of the project when Depp agreed to return, and Tom Hardy was in early talks for the role. However, Edgerton returned in the role.

In preparing for his role, Depp similarly studied surveillance and police audio footage involving Bulger. The actor was adamant in depicting the Boston gang leader's criminal and personal life as would be ultimately portrayed in the film. To achieve that, Depp attempted to meet with Bulger himself, but was declined a meeting and instead consulted Jay Carney, Bulger's attorney. Carney appeared on set a few times, to provide feedback on Depp's performance.

Filming
Principal photography commenced on May 19, 2014, in Boston; actors were seen filming scenes in Dorchester. On May 23, some shots were also filmed at Polish American Club (altered to recreate West Broadway's Triple O's Lounge, Whitey's infamous South Boston hangout), on Cambridge Street in Cambridge. On May 27, filming was taking place in East Boston, where Johnny Depp and Jesse Plemons were seen together on the set. Next day on May 28, Joel Edgerton was seen during filming of a scene on Silver Street in South Boston. On June 4, Depp was spotted in Lynn during a recreation of the 1982 murders of Brian Halloran and Michael Donahue by Bulger. On June 6–7, Depp was seen filming scenes at Copley Square in Boston.

On June 9, Depp's 51st birthday, he was filming scenes on location in Quincy, where actress Dakota Johnson was in Back Bay, playing Whitey Bulger's longtime former girlfriend, Lindsey Cyr. On June 11, shooting was underway in Lynn, where the crew was filming scenes in which Bulger and Stephen Flemmi pick up a prostitute named Deborah Hussey (played by Juno Temple) from the police station. Temple was seen on the set. On June 16, Depp and Plemons were spotted on the set of the film in South Boston.

On June 20, news posted some photos from the set of the film, which features classic cars from the film set in South Boston. On June 23, Cumberbatch and Depp were spotted during a re-creation of Saint Patrick's Day parade scenes in Lynn. On June 24, scenes were shot at the Harvard Club in Boston. On June 26, Cumberbatch was spotted with crew while filming around Ashmont Grill in Dorchester. On June 29, the pavement outside South Boston High School had graffiti readings of "Stop Forced Busing" and "Press Print the Truth."

On July 2, Depp and Cumberbatch were together filming some scenes in Boston. On July 7–8, filming was set to take place on Gilson Road in Quincy. A four-story building on 6 Gilson Road was transformed to resemble the Princess Eugenia apartments in Santa Monica, California, where FBI agents arrested Bulger on June 22, 2011. Arrest scenes were filmed there on July 7 and 8, and Sienna Miller was spotted dressed as Catherine Greig. From July 8–10, scenes were filmed on Revere Beach, so that a portion of Revere Beach remained closed. Between July 11–12, Revere Beach Boulevard remained closed for shooting. Revere Beach was transformed into Miami Beach, Florida, as live palm trees had been planted in the sand and a pizza restaurant was transformed into a Cuban cafe on Revere Beach Boulevard across the street from Beach. Depp as Whitey Bulger and Miller as Catherine Greig were spotted on the Black Mass set on the Revere Beach on July 10, 2014.

On July 15, Cumberbatch wrapped filming for his part in Boston. On July 21, Depp filmed some scenes at the former Anthony's Hawthorne restaurant, located at Oxford Street and Central Avenue in Lynn, which wrapped up filming for his role.

In July, director Cooper told The Boston Globe that filming had to take place for two more weeks in Boston, focusing on the FBI's role in the Bulger story. On July 25, Kevin Bacon was in Boston, filming some remaining scenes for the film. According to The Boston Globe, filming for Black Mass wrapped up on August 1, 2014, in Boston.

Post-production
Sienna Miller was cast and filmed scenes as Catherine Greig, Bulger's companion while a fugitive, but her scenes ended up getting cut from the film due to "narrative choices". Erica McDermott was cast as Mary Bulger, wife of Billy Bulger, but the majority of her scenes were cut out.

Release
On June 30, 2014, Warner Bros. set the film for a September 18, 2015 worldwide release. It was selected to be shown in the "Fuori Concorso" section of the Venice Film Festival. It was also shown at the Telluride Film Festival the next day, and in the Special Presentation section of the 2015 Toronto International Film Festival.

Marketing
On April 23, 2015, the first trailer for the film was released, followed by a second trailer on May 22. A third trailer was released on July 30.

Home media
Black Mass was released on DVD and Blu-ray on February 16, 2016.

Reception

Box office
Black Mass grossed $62.6 million in the United States and Canada, and $37.2 million in other territories, for a worldwide total of $99.8 million, against a production budget of $53 million.

In its opening weekend, the film was projected to earn around $26 million from 3,188 theaters. It grossed $8.8 million on its first day, including $1.4 million from its early Thursday showings. It ended up debuting to $22.6 million, finishing second at the box office behind fellow newcomer Maze Runner: The Scorch Trials ($30.3 million). It dropped 51% in its second weekend, making $11 million and finishing 5th.

Critical response
On Rotten Tomatoes the film has an approval rating of 73% based on 290 reviews and an average rating of 6.7/10. The site's critical consensus reads, "Black Mass spins a gripping yarn out of its fact-based story – and leaves audiences with one of Johnny Depp's most compelling performances in years." On Metacritic, the film has a rating of 68 out of 100, based on 43 critics, indicating "generally favorable reviews". Audiences polled by CinemaScore gave the film an average grade of "B" on an A+ to F scale.

Depp's portrayal of Bulger received critical acclaim with many calling it a return to form. Critics from The Hollywood Reporter, Variety, and TheWrap called it one of his best performances to date. The Hollywood Reporters Todd McCarthy, in addition to praising the film, called Depp's performance "fully convincing and frightening", saying it is "very welcome at this point in his career and one of his best."

Similarly, Indie Wires Eric Kohn praised the cast and highlighted Depp's performance and Cooper's directorial efforts to depict "the haunting legacy of Bulger's criminal deeds, and the lingering sense that no justice can erase their impact." Admiring Black Mass as an "elegantly understated crime drama", Varietys Scott Foundas positively compared Depp's performance in the film to his earlier roles with Tim Burton.

TheWraps Alonso Duralde praised Depp's performance, but was less positive towards the film's pacing and short onscreen appearances of some supporting characters. BBC Culture's Nicolas Barber found some of the subplots to be unnecessary (specifically mentioning Benedict Cumberbatch as Billy Bulger), and argued that "the film is never bad, but, given the gob-smacking true story, it's disappointing that it's not great". 

In a negative review, CraveOnline's Fred Topel labeled Black Mass as a "black mess". He criticized the screenwriting and argued that the film borrows too heavily from Goodfellas, writing: "...it's clear that the filmmakers wanted to turn this into Goodfellas and tried to shoehorn this story into a similar kind of seductive, funny, shocking gangster tale. ...Several scenes seem to want to be like the 'how am I funny?' scene in Goodfellas, but it's blatant".

Response by the subjects
Whitey Bulger himself disapproved of the film and refused to see it; his associate Kevin Weeks, while admitting the killings took place, otherwise called the movie "pure fiction", comprehensively disputing most of the film's depiction of events. Most crucially he also disavowed the characterisations of the key figures:

The only resemblance to Whitey's character was the hairline. [...] The mannerisms — the way that Whitey talked to us — he never swore at us. In all the years I was with that man, he never swore at me once. We never yelled at each other. [...] The language is all wrong [...] and Whitey never would've berated Stevie, either. Stevie was a psychopath. Stevie would've killed him. [...] Stevie wasn't all sympathetic, mourning, and sorrowful like he is in the movie. Stevie enjoyed murder.

Weeks also disagrees completely with his portrayal in the film, for instance, the suggestion the loss of his son had any impact on his behavior, or that Bulger ever once discussed business at home or with his brother.

Accolades

Lindsay Kimble of People believed Depp deserved an Academy Award nomination for his performance as Bulger and was surprised when his name was excluded from the list of nominees.

Soundtrack
The soundtrack, written and composed by Tom Holkenborg, was released on September 11, 2015, at WaterTower Music.

Track listing
"Black Mass Opening Title"
"Boston Crime Lord"
"John Connolly"
"Bulger Burial Ground"
"My Boy"
"Don't Wake Him Up"
"You Got Two Minutes"
"Aspirin"
"No Drugs, No Murder"
"I Will Pull the Plug Myself"
"When You Wake Up In the Morning"
"It's Just the Beginning"
"Martorano"
"Did You Ever See Whitey Bulger Murder Anyone?"
"Thanks to Whitey"
"Jimmy and Marianne"
"You'll Be Sorry"
"Boston Globe"
"Valhalla"
"Strictly Criminal"
"Take Care Kid"

2015 Watertower Music (61:26)

References

External links

 
 
 
 
 
 
 
 

2015 films
2015 biographical drama films
2015 crime drama films
2015 crime thriller films
American biographical drama films
American crime drama films
American crime thriller films
Crime films based on actual events
Cross Creek Pictures films
Dune Entertainment films
Infinitum Nihil films
Warner Bros. films
Drama films based on actual events
2010s English-language films
Films about the Federal Bureau of Investigation
Films scored by Junkie XL
Films about the Irish Mob
Films about organized crime in the United States
Films based on non-fiction books about organized crime
Films directed by Scott Cooper
Films produced by Brian Oliver
Films set in 1975
Films set in Boston
Films set in California
Films set in Florida
Films set in Massachusetts
Films set in Miami
Films set on beaches
Films shot in Boston
Films shot in Massachusetts
Thriller films based on actual events
Winter Hill Gang
Films with screenplays by Jez Butterworth
Biographical films about criminals
Films about witness protection
Films about brothers
2010s American films